Giulio Cesare la Galla (or Julius Cæsar Lagalla or Giulio Cesare Lagalla) (1571–1624) was a professor of philosophy at the Collegio Romano in Italy.

Biography 
He was born in Padula, at that time part of the Kingdom of Naples. Lagalla was educated in philosophy and medicine. He became the official physician of the papal galleys for a period, then came to Rome to lecture in natural philosophy at the Collegio Romano. He apparently became the leading peripatetic of the city, and was counted among the opponents of the Copernican heliocentric theory.

Following Galileo’s observations of the Moon by means of a telescope, published in Sidereus Nuncius, Lagalla published a booklet in response. He participated in the demonstrations of the instrument by Galileo and was not among those who doubted the ability of the instrument. But he did debate Galileo's three-dimensional representation of the Moon based on two-dimensional visual observations.

In his book De Phenomenis in Orbe Lunae (published in Venice in 1612) he claimed that the untreated stone (known as "lapis solaris" and shown to him by Galileo Galilei) was unable to give off light only after calcination. We now know that the "Bolognian Stone" was a piece of barite (barium sulphate).

The crater Lagalla on the Moon is named after him.

Bibliography
 
 
De Immortalitate animorum ex Aristot. sententia (1621)

External links
 
 

1576 births
1624 deaths
17th-century Italian philosophers